The 2015 season is the 139th season of competitive soccer in Canada.

National teams 

When available, the home team or the team that is designated as the home team is listed in the left column; the away team is in the right column.

Men

Senior

2018 FIFA World Cup Qualifiers

2015 CONCACAF Gold Cup 

 eliminated in the group stage.

Friendlies

Olympic 
Many Olympic competitions place certain age restrictions on competitors for the men's tournament (for example, a U-22 requirement at the 2015 Pan American Games).  These teams are listed by Soccer Canada as "Olympic teams".

2015 Pan American Games 

 eliminated in the group stage.

2016 Olympic Qualifiers 

 finishes in fourth place; does not qualify for the 2016 Summer Olympics.

Women

Senior

2015 FIFA Women's World Cup 

 eliminated in the quarterfinals.

2015 Pan American Games 

While there were no age restrictions placed on teams in this tournament, Canada opted to enter an under-23 squad to provide experience for those who may join the senior national team in the future.

 finishes in fourth place.

2015 Cyprus Women's Cup 

 finishes in  second place.

2015 Four Nations Tournament 

 finishes in  first place.

2015 International Tournament of Natal 

 finishes in  second place.

Friendlies

Domestic leagues

Men

Major League Soccer 

Three Canadian teams (Montreal Impact, Toronto FC, and Vancouver Whitecaps FC) play in this league, which also contains seventeen teams from the United States.  It is considered a Division 1 league in the Canadian soccer league system.

Overall standings

North American Soccer League 

Two Canadian teams (FC Edmonton and Ottawa Fury FC) play in this league, which also contains nine teams from the United States.  It is considered a Division 2 league in the Canadian soccer league system.
Overall standings

United Soccer League 

Three Canadian teams (FC Montreal, Toronto FC II, and Whitecaps FC 2) play in this league, which also contains 21 teams from the United States.  It is considered a Division 3 league in the Canadian soccer league system.

Eastern Conference

Western Conference

League1 Ontario 

Twelve teams play in this league, all of which are based in Canada.  It is considered a Division 3 league in the Canadian soccer league system.

Première Ligue de soccer du Québec 

Seven teams play in this league, all of which are based in Canada.  It is considered a Division 3 league in the Canadian soccer league system.

Canadian Soccer League 
 
Twenty two teams play in this league, all of which are based in Canada. It is a Non-FIFA league previously sanctioned by the Canadian Soccer Association and is now a member of the Soccer Federation of Canada (SFC).

First Division

Second Division

Women

National Women's Soccer League 

No Canadian teams play in this league, though eleven players from the Canada women's national soccer team play on its teams.  It is considered a Division 1 league in the Canadian soccer league system.
Overall standings

W-League 

Two Canadian teams (Laval Comets and Quebec Dynamo ARSQ) play in this league, which also contains sixteen teams from the United States.  It is considered a Division 2 league in the Canadian soccer league system.

Northeastern Conference

 Semi-Finals

 Third Place Playoff

League1 Ontario 

Seven teams play in this league, all of which are based in Canada.  It is considered a Division 3 league in the Canadian soccer league system.

Domestic Cups

Men

Canadian Championship 

The Canadian Championship is contested by men's teams at the division 1 & 2 level.

Inter-Provincial Cup 
The Inter-Provincial Cup is a two-legged home-and-away series at the division 3 level played between the season champions of League1 Ontario and the Première Ligue de soccer du Québec.

 Oakville Blue Devils win 5–3 on aggregate.

Challenge Trophy 

The Challenge Trophy is a national cup contested by men's teams at the division 4 level and below.

Women

Jubilee Trophy  

The Jubilee Trophy is a national cup contested by women's teams at the division 4 level and below.

Canadian clubs in international competition

2014–15 CONCACAF Champions League 

 Montreal Impact finishes in  second place.

2015-16 CONCACAF Champions League 

 Vancouver Whitecaps FC eliminated in the group stage.

References

External links 
 Canadian Soccer Association

 
Seasons in Canadian soccer